Merv Richardson (17 May 1929 – 31 August 1961) was an Australian rules footballer who played with Geelong in the Victorian Football League (VFL).

Notes

External links 

1929 births
1961 deaths
Australian rules footballers from Victoria (Australia)
Geelong Football Club players
East Geelong Football Club players